Asterivora combinatana is a species of moth in the family Choreutidae.  It is endemic to New Zealand and has been observed at locations in both the North and South Islands. The larvae feed on Senecio bellidioides and Brachyglottis repanda either from within a silken gallery or alternatively a silken curtain under which they feed. It is double brooded with adults being on the wing from September until November and again from February until April. This species is a day flying moth. It is extremely variable both in colouration and in size. The female tends to be larger and paler than the male of the species.

Taxonomy

This species was first described by Francis Walker in 1863 and named Simaethis combinatana. In 1883 Edward Meyrick synonymised Simaethis abstitella with Simaethis combinatana. In 1927 Alfred Philpott studied the male genitalia of this species. In 1928 George Hudson discussed and illustrated this species in his book The butterflies and moths of New Zealand under the name Simaethis combinatana. In that publication Hudson synonymised S. zomeuta with S. combinatana. In 1979 J. S. Dugdale placed S. combinatana within the genus Asterivora. In 1988 Dugdale confirmed this placement. In the 1979 publication Dugdale treated S. zomeuta as a separate species and placed it within the genus Asterivora. However, in his 1988 publication Dugdale synonymised A. zomeuta with A. combinatana. The female lectotype specimen of A. combinatana, collected in Auckland, is held at the Natural History Museum, London.

Description 

Walker described this species as follows:
This species is extremely variable both in colouration and in size. The female tends to be larger and paler than the male of the species. It is very similar in appearance to its sister species Asterivora colpota and is easily confused with the same.

Hudson described the larva of this species as follows:

Distribution
It is endemic to New Zealand. This species has been observed in both the North and South Islands including at Kaeo, Waimarino, Ohakune, Wellington, Mount Arthur and the Ōtira River.

Behaviour
This species is a day flying moth. It is double brooded with adults being on the wing from September until November and again from February until April. Whilst at rest this species places its wings backwards and slightly lifted, with the antennae extended and the hindwings often almost hidden. Hudson described their flying manner as "fussy".

Life history
The larvae feed on Senecio bellidioides and Brachyglottis repanda. When feeding off S. bellidioides they live in a silken gallery, is formed amongst the young shoots of the plant. When feeding on B. repanda they build a silken curtain under which they shelter and feed. Pupation takes place in white silken cocoons amongst the dead shoots of their host plant.

References

Asterivora
Moths of New Zealand
Endemic fauna of New Zealand
Moths described in 1863
Taxa named by Francis Walker (entomologist)
Endemic moths of New Zealand